Ectinus is a genus of beetles belonging to the family Elateridae.

The species of this genus are found in Europe and Japan.

Species:
 Ectinus aterrimus (Linnaeus, 1760)

References

Elateridae
Elateridae genera